Wonka Vision was an American music magazine.

History
While Justin Luczejko was attending high school, he started Wonka Vision with two friends, Elysa Stein and Andrew Wertz in 1998; a twenty-page zine that they copied at an OfficeMax store. Philadelphia City Paper describes Wonka Vision as an "ambitious music and pop culture zine started as a creative outlet for a kid stranded in suburbia." The name comes from the 1971 film, Willy Wonka & the Chocolate Factory. In 2001 Wonka Vision also became a record label. Wonka Vision ceased publication in 2010.

Content
Wonka Vision contains interviews, reviews, poetry, indie-punk and zine reviews, and "pointed leftist rants and bits of kitschy minutiae." The cover is printed in full color. Guitarist Colin Frangicetto did photography for the magazine. In a 2008 interview with South Philly Review, Luczejko explains that Wonka Vision "do[es] art, politics, anything that's sort of underground, on that edge [...] it's not just rock, we do hip-hop-always have-I grew up listening to rap, indie rock, hardcore, we've done what we love." The bimonthly magazine featured interviews, album reviews, and pop culture articles.

References

Citations

Bibliography

External links

1997 establishments in Pennsylvania
2010 disestablishments in Pennsylvania
Bimonthly magazines published in the United States
Music magazines published in the United States
Defunct magazines published in the United States
Magazines established in 1997
Magazines disestablished in 2010
Magazines published in Philadelphia